Pasiphila rubella is a moth in the family Geometridae. It is endemic to New Zealand.

The larvae feed on the flowers of Hebe species.

References

Moths described in 1915
rubella
Moths of New Zealand